The fourth part of the world may refer to;

The New World, also called "the fourth part of the world"
Americae Sive Quartae Orbis Partis Nova Et Exactissima Descriptio or The Fourth Part of the World, a 1562 geographical map
The Fourth Part of the World: The Epic Story of History's Greatest Map, a 2009 book by Toby Lester

See also
Johannes Schöner globe, for popularization of the term.
Four continents
Four corners of the world (disambiguation)
Fourth World (disambiguation)

Geographical regions
Western Hemisphere
European colonization of the Americas
Country classifications